Anna Marie Pyle is an American academic who is a Sterling Professor of Molecular, Cellular & Developmental Biology and a Professor of Chemistry at Yale University.  and an Investigator for Howard Hughes Medical Institute. Pyle is the president of the RNA Society, the vice-chair of the Science and Technology Steering Committee at Brookhaven National Laboratory, and previously she served as chair of the Macromolecular Structure and Function A Study Section at the National Institutes of Health.

Early life and education 
Pyle grew up in Albuquerque, New Mexico, and it was there that she first became interested in science. But it wasn't until after earning her bachelor's degree from Princeton University that she committed to a career in chemistry. In 1990, she graduated from Columbia University with a Ph.D. in chemistry. Pyle went on to postdoc at the University of Colorado until in 1992 she established a research group at Columbia University Medical Center in the Department of Biochemistry and Molecular Biophysics. In 2002, she moved to Yale University.

Research 
Pyle joined Yale University in 2002. She researches the architectural features of large RNA molecules and RNA remodeling enzymes using experimental biochemistry and crystallography. such as self-splicing introns and other noncoding RNAs. She has focused her research to understand how large RNAs assemble into specific, stable tertiary structures, and also how ATP-dependent enzymes in the cell recognize and remodel RNA. Specifically, she was successful in crystallizing and solving the structure of a group IIC intron from the bacterium Oceanobacillus iheyensis and moves through the stages of splicing. Pyle's research may be helpful in drug development as RNA's tertiary structure could provide insight into druggable biomolecules.

Selected awards and honors 

 2018 Appointed as Sterling Professor of Molecular, Cellular, and Developmental Biology
 2007 Elected American Association for the Advancement of Science (AAAS) Fellow
 2005 Appointed member of the American Academy of Arts and Sciences

References 

Living people
Yale University faculty
Yale Sterling Professors
Princeton University alumni
American women biologists
American women biochemists
Howard Hughes Medical Investigators
Year of birth missing (living people)
People from Albuquerque, New Mexico
Columbia Graduate School of Arts and Sciences alumni
University of Colorado Boulder alumni
Place of birth missing (living people)
Fellows of the American Association for the Advancement of Science
Fellows of the American Academy of Arts and Sciences
American women academics
21st-century American women